The list of teams and cyclists in the 2007 Tour de France contains the professional road bicycle racers who competed at the 2007 Tour de France from July 7 to July 29, 2007. Of the 20 UCI ProTour teams, Unibet.Com was not allowed to participate because their gambling sponsor conflicts with the law in France. Of the non-ProTour teams, the organisation invited 
Agritubel and Barloworld.

Selection information 
In the weeks before the start, many rumours and speculations were heard about which riders would or would not be selected for the race.
 Gilberto Simoni declared to be feeling too tired to participate in the tour this year. His team manager Mauro Gianetti mentioned that Saunier Duval–Prodir intended sending Francisco Ventoso, Juan José Cobo, José Ángel Gómez Marchante, David de la Fuente, Iker Camaño, Rubén Lobato, Christophe Rinero, Iban Mayo and David Millar to the Tour. This leaves Riccardo Riccò and Leonardo Piepoli out of the team.
 Marc Sergeant declared on June 2 that for Predictor–Lotto six riders (Robbie McEwen, Cadel Evans, Chris Horner, Leif Hoste, Wim Vansevenant and Dario Cioni) had already been selected, while six others (Bjorn Leukemans, Mario Aerts, Fred Rodriguez, Roy Sentjens, Bert Roesems and Josep Jufré Pou are still competing for the last three spots. need to prove themselves to join the certainties in France this summer.
 For Rabobank, Manager Erik Breukink created a shortlist of 13 riders who are still in contention on June 8, those are: Michael Boogerd, Bram de Groot, Thomas Dekker, Theo Eltink, Juan Antonio Flecha, Óscar Freire, Mathew Hayman, Pedro Horrillo, Denis Menchov, Koos Moerenhout, Grischa Niermann, Michael Rasmussen and Pieter Weening. The final selection was announced on June 25.
 Will ride for Caisse d'Epargne: Alejandro Valverde, Vladimir Karpets, Óscar Pereiro, Florent Brard, José Vicente García, Francisco Pérez, Nicolas Portal, Luis León Sánchez and Xabier Zandio.
 On June 11, team AG2R Prévoyance named the following riders as certainties for the tour: Cyril Dessel, Christophe Moreau, José Luis Arrieta, Martin Elmiger, Stéphane Goubert and John Gadret. Seven other riders were still in contention for the three remaining places, namely: Simon Gerrans, Sylvain Calzati, Jean-Patrick Nazon, Ludovic Turpin, Hubert Dupont, Alexandre Usov and Yuriy Krivtsov.
 Also on June 11, both Astana Team, Team CSC and T-Mobile Team announced their candidates for the Tour. For Astana Team 12 riders were still in contention: Alexander Vinokourov, Andreas Klöden and 7 other riders from this list: Andrey Kashechkin, Matthias Kessler, Maxim Iglinsky, Antonio Colom, Benoît Joachim, Gennady Mikhaylov, Eddy Mazzoleni, Grégory Rast, Paolo Savoldelli and Sergei Ivanov. T-Mobile Team selected 6 riders (Michael Rogers, Marcus Burghardt, Patrik Sinkewitz, Linus Gerdemann, Kim Kirchen and Mark Cavendish) with three more named nearer the start of the race.
 Damiano Cunego announced on June 14 that he would not be taking part in the Tour de France this year.
 On June 25 it was decided that for Cofidis this year's team would consist of Stéphane Augé, Sylvain Chavanel, Geoffroy Lequatre, Cristian Moreni, Nick Nuyens, Iván Parra, Staf Scheirlinckx, Rik Verbrugghe and Bradley Wiggins. The reserves in case of injury or illness were Leonardo Duque and Kevin De Weert.
 Discovery Channel announced their full team on June 27. Johan Bruyneel, Discovery sport director, announced that Levi Leipheimer would lead assisted by George Hincapie, Egoi Martínez, Benjamín Noval, Yaroslav Popovych, Alberto Contador, Vladimir Gusev, Sérgio Paulinho and Tomas Vaitkus . Following recent illness, there was no space for Tom Danielson.
 For Team CSC, the full squad was announced on June 29. Carlos Sastre leads the team with Fränk Schleck, Fabian Cancellara, David Zabriskie, Stuart O'Grady, Kurt Asle Arvesen, Íñigo Cuesta, Jens Voigt, Christian Vande Velde Due to his 1996 doping admission, Bjarne Riis will not be the team director this year, being replaced by Kim Andersen.
On 5 July, Team Milram announced that Alessandro Petacchi will not race the Tour de France after his non-negative doping test at this year's Giro d'Italia.
On 3 July, it was announced that no one would use #1 during the 2007 Tour.
The full list of riders with race numbers was confirmed by the tour organisers on Friday 6 July

Teams

Summary of the field
 Spain has most riders with 41. France has 36.
 26 nations are represented.
 Euskaltel is the only team that has all its riders from the same country.
 There are six current road race national champions: Dean, Hincapie, Iglinsky, Moreau, Valjavec and Wegmann, and seven current time trial national champions: Zabriskie, Cancellara, Clement, B. Grabsch, Gusev, Gutierrez and Vaugrenard.
 There is no earlier Tour de France general classification winner in the Tour. (Pereiro was awarded 2006 win in September 2007)
 Three riders have won a Grand Tour: Savoldelli (Giro 2002&2005), Menchov (Vuelta 2005) and Vinokourov (Vuelta 2006).
 Three riders have won points competition in Tour de France: Zabel (1996–2001), McEwen (2002, 2004, 2006) and Hushovd (2005).
 Two riders have won the King of the Mountains competition in Tour de France: Rinero (1998) and Rasmussen (2005–06).
 Four riders have won the U25 competition in Tour de France: Salmon (1999), Menchov (2003), Karpets (2004) and Popovych (2005).
 36 riders have won a stage in Tour de France earlier: Boogerd, Boonen, Calzati, Cancellara, Cardenas, Fedrigo, Flecha, Freire, García Acosta, Halgand, Hincapie, Hushovd, Ivanov, Mayo, McEwen, Menchov, Mercado, Millar, Moreau, O'Grady, Pereiro, Popovych, Pozzato, Rasmussen, Sastre, Savoldelli, Schleck, Tosatto, Valverde, Vasseur, Verbrugghe, Vinokourov, Voigt, Weening, Zabel and Zabriskie.
 Riders who won their first Tour de France stage in 2007: Bennati, Casar, Contador, Gerdemann, Hunter, Leipheimer, Soler, Steegmans. Evans and Kirchen were awarded stage wins in 2008, after Alexander Vinokourov was removed from the stage results.
 15 riders who have worn the yellow jersey: Boonen, Cancellara, Dessel, Hincapie, Hushovd, McEwen, Millar, Moreau, O'Grady, Pereiro, Vasseur, Voeckler, Voigt, Zabel and Zabriskie.
 Riders who wore yellow jersey for the first time in 2007: Contador, Gerdemann, Rasmussen.
 21 riders who finished Giro d'Italia earlier this year: Aerts, Arroyo, Arvesen, Bruseghin, Cañada, Cioni, Cortinovis, Dean, Förster, Jegou, Knees, Krauss, Lancaster, Mayo, Merckx, Parra, Rasmussen, Savoldelli, Tosatto, Vila, Zabriskie.
 10 riders who started Giro but abandoned: Cancellara, Halgand, Hincapie, Hushovd, McEwen, Napolitano, Ongarato, Popovych, Voeckler, Wegelius.

See also
2007 Tour de France
List of teams and cyclists in the 2006 Tour de France

References

2007 Tour de France
2007